Cherif Merzouki or Cherif Merzougui or Merzogui (February 8, 1951 Amentan, Menaa, Aurès - April 4, 1991 Aurès ) was a painter and Illustrator.

References

Sources

External links 
Newspress Liberty Algeria 
L'Expression newspapers Algeria 2003

Abstract artists
1951 births
Chaoui people
1991 deaths
20th-century Algerian painters
Algerian artists